Kit Ryan is a film director and screenwriter.

Filmography
Botched (2007)
Dementamania (2013)
Property of the State (2017)

References

External links
 

Horror film directors
Year of birth missing (living people)
Living people
British film directors